Here We Go, Stereo is an album by the Dutch rock band Racoon. It was first released in October 2001.

Track listing
 "Reach"
 "Side Effects"
 "Eric's Bar"
 "Back You Up"
 "Biggest Fan"
 "World Without Worries"
 "Water By The Bed"
 "Tic Toc"
 "Autumn Tunes"
 "Wendy"
 "Paper Home"
 "Lukas Song"
 "Hardcore Tapes"

2001 albums
Racoon (band) albums